Philothamnus battersbyi, also known commonly as Battersby's green snake, is a species of snake in the family Colubridae. The species is native to northeastern Africa.

Etymology
The specific name, battersbyi, is in honor of British herpetologist James Clarence Battersby (1901–1993).

Geographic range
P. battersbyi is found in Ethiopia, Kenya, Somalia, Sudan, Tanzania, and Uganda.

Habitat
It has also been found in polluted streams in major cities.

Description

Behavior
P. battersbyi is arboreal and diurnal.

Diet
P. battersbyi preys upon amphibians, which may include caecilians, frogs, and toads.

Reproduction
P. battersbyi is oviparous. Clutch size is 3–11 eggs. Some communal nesting has been observed, with as many as 40 adult females laying over 100 eggs together in one nest.

References

Further reading
Chippaux J-P, Jackson K (1951). Snakes of Central and Western Africa. Baltimore: Johns Hopkins University Press. 448 pp. .
Lanza B (1990). "Amphibians and reptiles of the Somali Democratic Republic: check list and biogeography". Biogeographia 14: 407–465. (Philothamnus battersbyi, p. 439).
Loveridge A (1951). "On Reptiles and Amphibians from Tanganyika Territory Collected by C. J. P. Ionides". Bulletin of the Museum of Comparative Zoölogy at Harvard College 106 (4): 175–204. (Philothamnus irregularis battersbyi, new subspecies, pp. 190–191).
Spawls S, Howell K, Hinkel H, Menegon M (2018). Field Guide to East African Reptiles, Second Edition. London: Bloomsbury Natural History. 624 pp. . (Philothamnus battersbyi, p. 485).

Colubrids
Snakes of Africa
Reptiles of Ethiopia
Reptiles of Kenya
Reptiles of Tanzania
Reptiles of Uganda
Reptiles of Somalia
Vertebrates of Sudan
Reptiles described in 1951
Taxa named by Arthur Loveridge